Enemy in Sight may refer to:
Enemy in Sight (card game)
Enemy in Sight (video game)